Viktor Ulyanich (February 26, 1949 – November 27, 2014) was a Soviet boxer who was European champion in 1973, finalist of the European Championship in 1975, championship finalist of the USSR in 1979 and winner of the USSR championships (1974, 1975) in the weight category over 81 kg, He was a Honored Master of Sports of Russia and USSR, head coach of the Russian Armed Forces, among his students were champions of the country and Europe, Honored Master of Sports Viktor Rybakov, Ulyanich, Eduard Dubovskii, Aleksandr Lukach and others.

Ulyanich died on November 27, 2014.

References

External links
Boxing - 1973 European Men's Boxing Championships - Results Men
 Died European champion in boxing-1973 heavyweight Viktor Ulyanich 
 Виктор Ульянич. Настоящий тяжеловес

1949 births
2014 deaths
Soviet male boxers
Honoured Masters of Sport of the USSR
Heavyweight boxers